Pseudochazara schahrudensis or Shahrud grayling is a species of butterfly in the family Nymphalidae. It is confined to Bitlis, Hakkari, Van, Şırnak in Turkey; to the Caucasus to the eastern Alborz.

Habitat 
In Armenia the species occupies dry clayey and stony habitats including semi-deserts and mountain steppes at 1000–2500 metres above sea level.

Flight period 
The species is univoltine and is on wing from June to September.

Food plants
Larvae feed on grasses.

Subspecies
Pseudochazara schahrudensis schahrudensis Turkey, Armenia, and Dagestan
Pseudochazara schahrudensis nukatli (Bogdanov, 2000) Verkhny (near) Gunib. Nukatl' Mts – Dagestan

References

External links
 Satyrinae of the Western Palearctic - Pseudochazara schahrudensis

Pseudochazara
Butterflies described in 1881
Butterflies of Asia
Taxa named by Otto Staudinger